Kunstteich Neudorf is a reservoir near Neudorf in the Harz Mountains, Saxony-Anhalt, Germany. It is fed and drained by a small tributary of the Schmale Wipper, itself a tributary of the Wipper.

Reservoirs in Saxony-Anhalt
RNeudorf